Lynn High School may refer to:

 Lynn English High School, Lynn, Massachusetts
 Lynn Classical High School, Lynn, Massachusetts
 Old Lynn High School, Lynn, Massachusetts